Star Wars: Droids: The Adventures of R2-D2 and C-3PO is a 1985 animated television series spin off from the original Star Wars trilogy. The series was produced by Nelvana on behalf of Lucasfilm and broadcast on ABC with its sister series Ewoks (as part of The Ewoks and Droids Adventure Hour).

The series ran for one season of 13 half-hour episodes; an hour-long special broadcast in 1986 serves as the finale.

The opening theme, "In Trouble Again," was performed by Stewart Copeland of the Police. During their adventures, the droids find themselves in the service of successive new masters. The original trilogy characters Boba Fett and IG-88 appear in one episode apiece. Since then the animated series has become a cult classic.

Premise
During their adventures, the droids find themselves in the service of successive new masters and in difficult situations as a result.

The series was retroactively placed four years after Revenge of the Sith and fifteen years before the events of A New Hope. In the latter film,  tells Luke Skywalker that his and R2-D2's "last master was Captain Antilles." The droids are placed in Antilles' care by Bail Organa at the end of Revenge of the Sith, creating an apparent continuity error. This is explained by the droids being accidentally separated from Antilles during the events of the animated series.

Cast and characters

Main
 Anthony Daniels as C-3PO; Daniels also portrayed the character in the films.
 Ben Burtt as R2-D2 (uncredited)

Recurring/guest
 Don Francks as Jann Tosh, Boba Fett, Gir Kybo Ren-Cha / Kybo Ren
 Winston Rekert as Sise Fromm, Mungo Baobab
  Graeme Campbell as Proto One, Admiral Terrinald Screed, and Lord Toda
 Peter MacNeill as Jord Dusat
 Taborah Johnson as Jessica Meade
 John Stocker as Vlix Oncard, Greej, Zatec-Cha, and Sollag
  Rob Cowan as Thall Joben
 Dan Hennessey as Jord Dusat (episode 4), Uncle Gundy, Jyn Obah, Vinga, Yorpa, Governor Koong, and Captain Cag
 Cree Summer as Princess Gerin
  Jan Austin as Auren Yomm
 Long John Baldry as the Great Heep, Roto
 Lesleh Donaldson as Kea Moll
 Chris Wiggins as Mon Julpa
 Stephen Ouimette as the narrator
 Winston Rekert as Tig Fromm

Other guest stars include George Buza, Andrew Sabiston, Eric Peterson, Jamie Dick, Donny Burns, Alan Fawcett, Don McManus, and Gordon Masten.

Production and broadcast
The series was produced by the Canadian company Nelvana for Lucasfilm. Several episodes were written by Star Wars sound designer Ben Burtt. Hanho Heung-Up Co. was the Korean company hired to animate the series.

In the UK, BBC Television bought rights to screen the series in its entirety between 1986 and 1991 as part of the Children's BBC programming strand. The entire series was shown twice within this time (in 1986 and 1988 to coincide with the full release of the Star Wars trilogy as well as Droids on VHS). The Great Heep only made one showing in 1989 on BBC's Going Live!, which was a Saturday morning children's show—it was split into two parts over two weeks. Different episodes from different cycles were also screened across the five-year licence, with the Trigon cycle being shown in full in early 1991 on another Saturday morning children's show called The 8:15 from Manchester.

The opening theme, "In Trouble Again", was performed by Stewart Copeland of the Police and written by him and Derek Holt.

The series was broadcast on ABC with its sister series Ewoks (as part of The Ewoks and Droids Adventure Hour). It debuted in 1985 as part of a fitness special hosted by Tony Danza and live-action versions of the droids. It ran for one season of 13 half-hour episodes; an hour-long special broadcast in 1986 serves as the finale. Droids and Ewoks were later shown in reruns on Sci-Fi Channel's Cartoon Quest in 1996, although somewhat edited for time.

In the UK this series, along with Ewoks, was released on VHS as part of a promotion with Dairylea Cheese. Families could send in empty packages of the Cheese and in return get one of 6 VHS tapes. These videotapes are rare and sought after amongst collectors

Episodes
Over the course of the series, the droids team up with three different sets of masters. The series falls into three cycles or arcs; the droids usually run into their new masters at the beginning of each, and at the end are forced to leave.
The Great Heep, a 48-minute television special following the series, is set before the final arc.

Merchandising
In 1985, Kenner produced a toy line based on the series, including action figures, ship models, and other items. Two action figures, Boba Fett and A-wing Pilot, were repackaged figures from the main Star Wars line. The toy line was canceled after the first group of 12 figures due to decreasing popularity with Star Wars. In 1987 and then 1988, Glasslite of Brazil issued remaining Kenner stock and produced a very limited run of remaining Return of the Jedi and Droids toys from a sell off. Certain vehicles, mini-rigs and action figures were issued by the company in new packaging. The character Vlix (Tig Fromm's henchman) was an action figure exclusive from unused molds by Kenner. Like the remainder of the Glasslite line, very few were made, even less were sold and most were recycled due to the failing economy when money was tight across the country. Vlix was the most valuable Star Wars action figure (at about $6,000 carded or $1,200 loose), until a Fett figure sold for £69,000 ($USD 92,000) at an auction.

Between 1985 and 1987, a number of episodes were adapted into children's storybooks.

A computer game was released in 1988 for the ZX Spectrum, Amstrad CPC and Commodore 64 by Mastertronic.

In 2021, for Lucasfilm's 50th anniversary, Hasbro released a Target-exclusive line of action figures based on the series, featuring the titular droid duo and Boba Fett. Fett was also released as a larger Black Series figure.

Comic book series
In 1986, Marvel's Star Comics imprint published a Star Wars: Droids comic series spun off from the cartoon. The  series ran for eight issues. Four issues and issue 5's cover of the series were drawn by John Romita, Sr. The "Lost in Time" crossover story from Droids #4 was continued in an issue of Ewoks. The last three issues are part of an arc recounting the original Star Wars film from the droids' point of view. Additionally, Spanish comics publisher Editorial Gepsa produced two-page Droids comics as part of an anthology series.

Home media
Almost all episodes of the series (except "Coby and the Starhunters") were released on VHS in the 1980s and 1990s, most notably the UK PAL releases over four cassettes (Droids 1–3 and The Great Heep), which had the opening sequences and credits edited out. In 1996, Rick McCallum produced The Pirates and the Prince, a direct-to-video film compiled from four episodes. In late 2004, McCallum and Lucasfilm produced a DVD titled Star Wars: Animated Adventures – Droids, which featured The Pirates and the Prince and Treasure of the Hidden Planet, a new compilation film including narration from Mungo Baobab (voiced by Alex Lindsay). This was released by 20th Century Fox in 2005. Both titles included some soundtrack changes.

On April 2, 2021, it was announced that the entire series would be released on Disney+ later in 2021. All 13 episodes, along with the special, were added on June 18, 2021.

Reception
According to David Perlmutter, compared with Ewoks, Droids "was rudimentary, with short enough story lines for as many as four narratives in a single episode. Obviously, neither Lucas nor the animation studio had enough faith in the characters to trust them as anything other than second bananas." SyFy Wire writes that "Droids struggles to find a way to make the duo's live-action antics as entertaining on the small screen as they are on the silver one; the show tries to serve up a very, very kid-friendly take on that galaxy far, far away and it doesn't always hit the mark." ComicBook.com calls it a "must-watch".

Legacy
Ben Burtt wrote liner notes for the Shadows of the Empire soundtrack, which referenced the Roonstones he had written about in Droids; Burtt made a cameo appearance in Episode I – The Phantom Menace, and named his character after the Baobabs. Several references to the animated series are made in the prequels, such as the Boonta Eve Classic in The Phantom Menace, the planet Bogden and a four-armed cook in Attack of the Clones, and General Grievous' wheel bike design in Revenge of the Sith.

Genndy Tartakovsky gave C-3PO moving, expressive eyes in Clone Wars (2003) to pay homage to his previous animated appearances in Nelvana's Star Wars Holiday Special (1978) and Droids. While Droids was excluded in the 2014 rebranding of Star Wars canon, recurring villain Admiral Screed—whom A Guide to the Star Wars Universe describes as "the Emperor's right-hand man during the early days of the Empire"—makes appearances in canon novels such as Tarkin (2014) and Aftermath: Life Debt (2016). Additionally, possible sources of inspiration for sequel trilogy main characters Rey and Kylo Ren have been noticed.

References

Further reading
 Star Wars: Droids 1985, George Lucas, Ben Burtt
 Star Wars Insider #27
 A Guide to the Star Wars Universe
 The Star Wars Encyclopedia by Stephen J. Sansweet,  Del Rey; first edition (June 30, 1998)

External links

 
 
 
 
 Star Wars: Droids at the Big Cartoon DataBase
 The Droids Re-Animated, Part 1 - StarWars.com
 The Droids Re-Animated, Part 2 - StarWars.com
 starwars.com DVD "Closer look"
 A history of home video releases of Star Wars: Droids
 Episode review of The White Witch
 A fan "Droids encyclopedia" blog at StarWars.com

1980s American animated television series
1980s American science fiction television series
1985 American television series debuts
1986 American television series endings
1980s Canadian animated television series
1980s Canadian science fiction television series
1985 Canadian television series debuts
1986 Canadian television series endings
American Broadcasting Company original programming
American children's animated science fantasy television series
American children's animated space adventure television series
Animated duos
Animated television series about extraterrestrial life
Animated television series about robots
Animated television shows based on films
Canadian children's animated space adventure television series
Canadian children's animated science fantasy television series
English-language television shows
Fictional duos
Space pirates
Star Comics titles
Droids
Television series by Nelvana
Television series by Lucasfilm
Television series by 20th Century Fox Television